is a Japanese war epic (gunki monogatari) detailing the events of the Heiji Rebellion of 1159–1160, in which samurai clan head Minamoto no Yoshitomo attacked and besieged Kyoto, as part of an Imperial succession dispute, in which he was opposed by Taira no Kiyomori, head of the Taira clan. The Tale, like most monogatari, exists in three main forms: written, oral, and painted.

The original text is sometimes attributed to Hamuro Tokinaga, and is written in 36 chapters. As is the case with most other monogatari, the text has been rewritten and revised many times over the years, and developed into an oral tradition as well. Most often, the Tale of Heiji would be chanted as a continuation of the Tale of Hōgen, which relates the events of the closely related Hōgen Rebellion.

The picture scroll version of the tale, called Heiji Monogatari Emaki or Heiji Monogatari Ekotoba, dates from the 13th century. It tells the tale in color on paper, on five scrolls. Each scroll begins and ends with a written portion of the tale, describing the events depicted in a single continuous painting across the length of the scroll. Perhaps the most famous scene of these five scrolls is the Night Attack on the Sanjō Palace. The emaki scrolls are now in the Museum of Fine Arts, Boston in Boston, Massachusetts.
A digital reproduction of this scene is visible at http://digital.princeton.edu/heijiscroll/

Rivalries
The Tale of Heiji presents a conflict between old aristocratic and new military elites.  The Heiji story moves beyond from the comparatively simple narration template of the Hōgen monogatari towards a more complicated focus which suggests a need for more nuanced principles and more flexible policies which become more appropriate to desperate times.

As in the Hōgen story, multi-level and inter-related rivalries lead to war; and the main characters are presented in traditional status order: Emperors and former Emperors first, Fujiwara ministers second, and military clan warriors third.
 1st level rivalry—a conflict amongst emperors:
 Cloistered Emperor Go-Shirakawa (後白河天皇), 1127–1192
 Emperor Nijo (二条天皇), 1143–1165
 2nd level rivalry—a conflict amongst kuge aristocrats:
 Fujiwara no Michinori (藤原通憲), also known by priestly name, Shinzei (信西), 11__-1160
 Fujiwara no Nobuyori (藤原信頼), 1133–1159
3rd level rivalry—a conflict amongst (and within) warrior clans:
 Taira no Kiyomori (平 清盛), 1118–1181
 Minamoto no Yoshitomo (源 義朝, 1123–1160

As in the Hōgen story, the narrative structure is divided in three distinct segments:
 Part 1 introduces origins of the conflicts.
 Part 2 retells the course of events.
 Part 3 enumerates the tragic consequences.

Monogatari historiography
The Japanese have developed a number of complementary strategies for capturing, preserving and disseminating the essential elements of their commonly accepted national history – chronicles of sovereigns and events, biographies of eminent persons and personalities, and the military tale or gunki monogatari.  This last form evolved from an interest in recording the activities of military conflicts in the late 12th century.  The major battles, the small skirmishes and the individual contests—and the military figures who animate these accounts—have all been passed from generation to generation in the narrative formats of the Hōgen monogatari (1156), the Heiji monagatari (1159–1160), and the Heike monogatari (1180–1185).

In each of these familiar monogatari, the central figures are popularly well known, the major events are generally understood, and the stakes as they were understood at the time are conventionally accepted as elements in the foundation of Japanese culture. The accuracy of each of these historical records has become a compelling subject for further study; and some accounts have been shown to withstand close scrutiny, while other presumed “facts” have turned out to be inaccurate.

See also
 Hōgen Rebellion, 1156
 Tale of Hōgen or Hōgen monogatari
 Heiji Rebellion, 1159–1160
 Genpei War, 1180–1185
 Tale of Heike or Heike monogatari

References

Heiji
Early Middle Japanese texts
Monogatari
12th-century history books
Gunki monogatari
12th-century Japanese books